N19 may refer to:

Roads
 N19 road (Belgium), a National Road in Belgium
 Route nationale 19, in France  
 N19 road (Ireland)
 Nebraska Highway 19, in the United States

Other uses
 N19 (Long Island bus)
 Aztec Municipal Airport, in Aztec, New Mexico, United States
 , a submarine of the Royal Navy
 London Buses route N19
 Nitrogen-19, an isotope of nitrogen
 N19, a postcode district in the N postcode area